Pirganj is an Upazila of Thakurgaon District in the Division of Rangpur, Bangladesh.

Geography
Pirganj Upazila, having an area of 353.30 sq km, is located in between 25°40' and 25°59' north latitudes and in between 88°15' and 88°22' east longitudes.

The upazila is bounded by Thakurgaon Sadar Upazila on the north, Birganj and Bochaganj upazilas in Dinajpur District on the east, Kaliaganj and Hemtabad CD blocks in Uttar Dinajpur district, West Bengal, India, on the south and Ranisankail Upazila on the west.

Demographics
As of the 1991 Bangladesh census, Pirganj has a population of 183,292 spread across 35,912 households. Males constitute 51.69% of the population and females 48.31%. This Upazila's eighteen up population is 92,296. Pirganj has an average literacy rate of 29.3% (7+ years), and the national average of 32.4% literate.

Administration
Pirganj was primarily formed as a Thana in 1870 and converted into an upazila on 7 November 1983.

Pirganj Upazila is divided into Pirganj Municipality and ten union parishads: Bairchuna, Bhomradaha, Daulatpur, Hazipur, Jabarhat, Khangaon, Kosharaniganj, Pirganj, Saidpur, and Sengaon. The union parishads are subdivided into 168 mauzas and 168 villages.

Rivers
There are 3 rivers in Pirganj upazila namely, Tangon River, Kahalai river and Lachchi river.

See also
Pirganj Upazila, Rangpur
Thakurgaon District
Rangpur Division

References

Upazilas of Thakurgaon District